Roman Rożek (born 5 August 1942) is a Polish boxer. He competed in the men's light flyweight event at the 1972 Summer Olympics.

References

1942 births
Living people
Polish male boxers
Olympic boxers of Poland
Boxers at the 1972 Summer Olympics
People from Busko County
Sportspeople from Świętokrzyskie Voivodeship
Light-flyweight boxers